David Gordon Mawutor (born 12 April 1992) is a Ghanaian-born Tajikistani professional footballer who played for Malaysia Super League club Negeri Sembilan. He predominantly plays as a central midfielder and at times play as a defensive.

Early career
Mawutor was born in Accra on 12 April 1992 and played for Thyword FC and YF Juventus SC 2.division in Ghana before moving to Tajikistan to start his professional career in 2012.

Ravshan Kulob
Mawutor initially joined Tajik League side Ravshan Kulob on loan for the 2012 season, making the move permanent the following season. Mawutor made his AFC Cup debut for Ravshan Kulob in a 0–1 defeat against Al-Ramtha on 6 March 2013. In 2013, Mawutor went on trial with Neftchala as a striker.

FC Istiklol
In January 2014, Mawutor signed a one-year contract with FC Istiklol.  
During January 2015, Mawutor went on trial with RFNL side Yenisey Krasnoyarsk. 
Mawutor left Istiklol in 2015, rejoining the club during the summer of 2016, and was included in the clubs 2017 AFC Cup squad, making his debut against Dordoi Bishkek, scoring the first goal in Istiklol's 2–0 win. On 18 April 2017, David scored his second goal for FC Istiklol in their 3–1 victory over FC Alay in the 2017 AFC Cup. Mawutor featured for Istiklol in their 1–0 2017 AFC Cup Final defeat to Iraqi club Al-Quwa Al-Jawiya on 4 November 2017, with the only goal coming from Emad Mohsin.

Towards the end of 2017, Mawutor began to attract interest from clubs in Europe. On 29 January 2018, Istiklol announced that Mawutor had left the club after they agreed to mutual terminate his contract four months early.

PSMS Medan
In January 2018, Mawutor was named  in PSMS Medan's President's Cup squad, but due to an issue with his registration never officially joined.

Zhetysu
In February 2018, it was report that Mawutor had signed a one-year contract with Kazakhstan Premier League club FC Zhetysu.

Wisła Kraków 
On 21 February 2021, Mawutor signed with Polish club Wisła Kraków. Mawutor left Wisła Kraków in May 2021 following the expiration of his contract, having played seven times for the club.

Shakhter Karagandy
On 14 July 2021, Shakhter Karagandy announced the signing of Mawutor.

Career statistics

Club

Personal life
In November 2016, Mawutor married his Ukrainian wife Victoria. He holds both Ghanaian and Tajiki citizenship.

Honours

Club
Ravshan Kulob
Tajik League: 2013

Istiklol
 Tajik League: 2014, 2015,2016, 2017
 Tajik Cup: 2014, 2015, 2016
 Tajik Supercup: 2014, 2015, 2016

Individual
 Ravshan Kulob
Best Foreign Footballer of Tajikistan Championship: 2013

References

External links
 
 
 

1996 births
Living people
Ghanaian expatriate footballers
Tajikistani footballers
Association football midfielders
FC Istiklol players
FC VPK-Ahro Shevchenkivka players
Ukrainian Amateur Football Championship players
Wisła Kraków players
FC Shakhter Karagandy players
Tajikistan Higher League players
Ekstraklasa players
Negeri Sembilan FC players
Tajikistani expatriate footballers
Expatriate footballers in Ukraine
Ghanaian expatriate sportspeople in Ukraine
Expatriate footballers in Poland
Expatriate footballers in Kazakhstan